Modulo is a division operation with a remainder as result.

Modulo may also refer to:

Mathematics and computer science 
 Modulo (mathematics), a word with multiple distinct meanings in mathematics
 Modular arithmetic, a part of a system of arithmetic for integers, where numbers "wrap around" upon reaching a certain value—the modulus

Other uses 
 Módulo, a Brazilian company specializing in IT governance
 Ferrari Modulo, a concept car from 1970

See also
 Modulus (disambiguation)
 Module (disambiguation)
 Mod (disambiguation)